Dever is a surname. Notable people with the surname include:

Barbara Dever (born 1951), opera singer, appeared with Luciano Pavarotti, Plácido Domingo, Zubin Mehta
Benjamin M. Dever (died 1942), American politician
Dan Dever (born 1946), Canadian football player
Dick Dever (born 1952), American politician
Edmonde Dever (born 1921), Belgian diplomat
James C. Dever III (born 1962), United States federal judge
James Dever (1825–1904), Irish-born merchant and political figure in New Brunswick, Canada
Jill Dever, American statistician
Joe Dever (1956–2016), award-winning British fantasy author and game designer
Juliana Dever (born 1980), American actress and travel blogger
Kaitlyn Dever (born 1996), American actress
Mark Dever (born 1960), senior pastor of the Capitol Hill Baptist Church in Washington, D.C.
Maryanne Dever (born 1963), Australian academic
Paul A. Dever (1903–1958), Democratic politician from Boston, Massachusetts
Seamus Dever (born 1976), American actor
William Emmett Dever (1862–1929), the Democratic mayor of Chicago, Illinois, U.S. from 1923 to 1927
William G. Dever (born 1933), American archaeologist, specialising in the history of Israel and the Near East in Biblical times

See also
Paul A. Dever State School, built as a military camp named Camp Myles Standish, located in Taunton, Massachusetts, USA
Dever Orgill (born 1990), Jamaican footballer
Huys Dever, small castle in Lisse, Netherlands
River Dever, river in the English county of Hampshire

pt:Dever